The Apoquindo Waterfall is a waterfall in Waters of Ramon Natural Park (Spanish: Parque Natural Aguas de Ramón) on the east side of Santiago, Chile, near Apoquindo. It is fed by melting snow from Cerro San Ramon and Cerro Provincia.

References

Waterfalls of Chile
Geography of Santiago, Chile
Landforms of Santiago Metropolitan Region